Lamprostola molybdipera is a moth of the subfamily Arctiinae. It was described by Schaus in 1899. It is found in Mexico.

References

Lithosiini
Moths described in 1899